Peter "Navy" Tuiasosopo (born May 24, 1965) is an American actor known for his roles as E. Honda in Universal Pictures Street Fighter and Manumana in the Paramount Pictures film Necessary Roughness. He also played custodian Yoshi Nakamura in the Disney TV show Kickin It. He is a former American football center in the National Football League for the Los Angeles Rams. He played college football at Utah State University.

Early years
Tuiasosopo attended Taper Avenue Elementary and Phineas Banning High School in the Wilmington section of Los Angeles. He lettered in both football as an offensive/defensive lineman and on the track team as a shot-putter. He accepted a football scholarship from Utah State University.

Professional football
Tuiasosopo was signed as an undrafted free agent by the St. Louis Cardinals after the 1987 NFL Draft. He was waived on August 1.

After the players went on a strike on the third week of the 1987 season, those games were canceled (reducing the 16-game season to 15) and the NFL decided that the games would be played with replacement players. In September, he was signed to be a part of the Los Angeles Rams replacement team. He started 3 games at center and was released after the strike ended.

On March 7, 1988, he was re-signed by the Los Angeles Rams. He was cut before the season started. On July 29, 1989, he was signed by the Los Angeles Rams. He was released before the start of the season.

Acting
Tuiasosopo is perhaps best known for playing the role of E. Honda in the live action movie Street Fighter along with Jean-Claude Van Damme and Raúl Juliá.

His first motion picture film role was Manumana "the Slender", the committed and respectful center on the fictional reconstructed Texas State "Fighting Armadillos" football team in the 1991 film Necessary Roughness. Tuiasosopo took a leave of absence from McDonnell Douglas in Long Beach, California for the film. Shortly afterwards, he co-starred in his first television series with original television Batman Adam West as the strong-armed detective Al Hamoki for the Fox network called Danger Theatre.  Tuiasosopo had another film role as Willie Dumaine in 12 Rounds along with WWE wrestler John Cena.

He also had a part in the NCIS season 10 episode "Hereafter" as Charles Kang / Chucky Bang.
He also played in the Disney TV show Kickin It as a custodian and an ex-sumo wrestler named Yoshi Nakamura.

Filmography

Personal life
Tuiasosopo was born and raised in San Pedro, Los Angeles, California. His father was U.S. Army (27 years) and U.S. Postal Service retired Manavaalofa Petelo "Sgt. Pete" Tuiasosopo (1935–2008) of Fagatogo, American Samoa and mother Registered Nurse (30 years) retired Silaulala "Sheila" Lealoa Alofaituli (1927–2007) of Vatia, American Samoa. He is one of seven children: Brother Andrew Tuiasosopo (Carson, California) and sisters Jean Redondo (Long Beach, California), Aavonda Gonzales (San Pedro, California), Aaleslie Speake (deceased), Aaona Speake (deceased) and Adaline Aure (Bellingham, Washington).

Tuiasosopo's uncle is Bob Apisa. His cousins are Manu Tuiasosopo, John Tautolo and Terry Tautolo. His second cousin is Marques Tuiasosopo.

References

External links
 

1965 births
Living people
Actors of Samoan descent
20th-century American male actors
21st-century American male actors
American male film actors
American male television actors
American people of Samoan descent
Male actors from Los Angeles
People from San Pedro, Los Angeles
Players of American football from American Samoa
American sportspeople of Samoan descent
American football centers
Utah State Aggies football players
Los Angeles Rams players
National Football League replacement players
Players of American football from Los Angeles